The 1959 Georgia Tech Yellow Jackets football team represented the Georgia Institute of Technology during the 1959 NCAA University Division football season. The Yellow Jackets were led by 15th-year head coach Bobby Dodd and played their home games at Grant Field in Atlanta. After winning their first four games of the season, three of which were victories over top ten opponents, Georgia Tech sat at #4 in the AP Poll. Georgia Tech's season was derailed by several close losses, however,  and they finished the regular season unranked with a 6–4 record. They were invited to the Gator Bowl, where they lost to Southwest Conference co-champion Arkansas.

The team's statistical leaders included Fred Braselton with 368 passing yards and Floyd Faucette with 330 rushing yards.

Schedule

Source:

References

Georgia Tech
Georgia Tech Yellow Jackets football seasons
Georgia Tech Yellow Jackets football